John A. Locke (born November 27, 1962 in Newton, Massachusetts) is an American attorney, farmer, and politician who represented the 14th Norfolk District in the Massachusetts House of Representatives from 1995 to 2003.

References

1962 births
Living people
Republican Party members of the Massachusetts House of Representatives
Politicians from Newton, Massachusetts
People from Wellesley, Massachusetts
American University alumni
Suffolk University Law School alumni
Massachusetts lawyers
Farmers from Massachusetts